Atheris is a genus of vipers known as bush vipers. They are found only in tropical subsaharan Africa (excluding southern Africa) and many species have isolated and fragmented distributions due to their confinement to rain forests. Like all other vipers, they are venomous. In an example of convergent evolution, they show many similarities to the arboreal pit vipers of Asia and South America. Seventeen species are currently recognized.

Description

All species have a broad, triangular head that is distinct from the neck. The canthus is also distinct and the snout is broad. The crown is covered with small imbricate or smooth scales, none of which is enlarged. The eyes are relatively large with elliptical pupils. The eyes are separated from the supralabials by 1–3 scale rows and from the nasal by 2–3 scales.

The body is slender, tapering, and slightly compressed. The dorsal scales are overlapping, strongly keeled and have apical pits. Laterally these are smaller than the middorsals. Midbody there are 14–36 rows of dorsal scales. There are 133–175 rounded ventral scales. The subcaudal scales are single and number 38–67. The tail is strongly prehensile and can support the body while suspended from a branch or a twig.

Members of this genus come in a wide variety of colors and patterns, often within a single species. A. ceratophora and A. squamigera are particularly variable.

Location
They inhabit rainforest regions and forests , mostly in remote areas far from human activity.

They are found in tropical subsaharan Africa, excluding southern Africa.
Some species have only isolated populations, surviving in small sections of ancient rainforest. They once had a much wider distribution but are now declining.

Conservation status
Some species are threatened by habitat destruction.
A major cause of illness and mortality in both caged and wild bush viper snakes is Snake fungal disease(SFD).

Behavior
All species have extreme aggressive tendencies. All species are strictly arboreal, although they can sometimes be found on or near the ground.

Diet
Atheris species have been known to prey upon a variety of small amphibians, lizards, rodents, birds, and even other snakes. Some species or populations may specialize in eating frogs, but most have been described as opportunistic feeders. Prey is typically ambushed from a hanging position, held until it has succumbed to the venom, and then swallowed.

Reproduction
All Atheris species are ovoviviparous. Mating takes place in October and November, and the females give birth to live young in March and April.

Captivity
A. squamigera is reported to do very well in captivity, needing only arboreal access and having no particular temperature requirements. Captive specimens take mice and small birds. However, there have been reports of cannibalism. Food may be refused during the African winter months of July and August.

Venom
Not much is known about their venom except that it is strongly hemotoxic, causing pain, swelling and blood clotting problems. Until recently, their venom has often been regarded as less toxic than that of many other species, perhaps because bites are uncommon, but this turned out not to be the case. There are now a number of reports of bites that have led to severe hemorrhaging. One case was fatal. Atheris-specific antivenom does not exist and antivenom meant for bites from other species seem to have little effect, although Echis antivenom has been reported to have been of some help in a case of A. squamigera envenomation. Symptomatic replacement therapy is applied due to the absence of an Atheris specific antivenom.

Species

*) Not including the nominate subspecies
T) Type species

Taxonomy
Other species may be encountered in literature, such as:

Until relatively recently, the following species, all of which are terrestrial, were also included in the genus Atheris:Montatheris hindii (Boulenger, 1910) – montane viperProatheris superciliaris (W. Peters, 1855) – lowland viper

Together with Atheris, these three genera are sometimes referred to as the tribe Atherini.

References

Further reading

Boulenger GA (1896). Catalogue of the Snakes in the British Museum (Natural History). Volume III., Containing the ...Viperidæ. London: Trustees of the British Museum (Natural History). (Taylor and Francis, printers.) xiv + 727 pp. + Plates I.- XXV. (Genus Atheris'', p. 508.)

External links

 
Snake genera
Taxa named by Edward Drinker Cope
Arabic-language albums
English-American culture in Maryland